Abteilung III b was the domestic counterintelligence branch of the Imperial German Army from 1889 until the end of the First World War. Initially created as a section in the Prussian General Staff in 1889 and named Sektion III b, it was upgraded to a department and renamed Abteilung III b in June 1915.

History 
The initial responsibilities of Sektion III b consisted solely of counterintelligence; it had limited foreign espionage capabilities. Its counter-espionage efforts focused on France and on Russia - as the Imperial German Navy had responsibility for intelligence on the United Kingdom. During the First World War of 1914–1918, III b additionally acquired roles in media censorship and propaganda.

In 1917 Abteilung III b gained authorization for domestic counterintelligence. The secret activities of III b developed under the head of Abteilung III b, Colonel Walter Nicolai (in office: 1913–1918), as war made the need for counter-espionage more pressing. Never before had a German intelligence group held such influence in the German Reich.

When the war began, the network of agents in enemy countries quickly evaporated as belligerent nations arrested the agents. The Secret Service could not provide information about enemy intentions and operational-deployment plans. At the General Staff, within the News Department, the 'enemy editor' grew more suspicious of information delivered as facts, as the intelligence service's reports often proved to be false. In the assessment of the enemy situation, there was one mishap after another. The fundamental error lay in the separation of news gathering and analysis.

As the war progressed, Abteilung III b increasingly established itself as a counterintelligence and ultra-nationalist propaganda organization. The Far-Left press often referred to Colonel Nicolai, the head of the Abteilung, as the "father of lies", among many other things.

In addition, Abteilung III b also expanded as the agents of the intelligence arm of the German Imperial Navy under diplomatic cover in the German Foreign Office were exposed in Mexico, Argentina, and the United States.

At the end of the war, the division was disbanded.

Outline 
During the First World War, the division was significantly upgraded and divided into press, propaganda, intelligence and defense:

 Mobile Division III b (attached to the OHL)
 Counterintelligence in operational territory
 Counterintelligence in occupied territory
 News service / press
 Neutral military attaché quarters

 Deputy Division III b (Berlin)
 Counterintelligence in Germany
 News service / press
 Politics

 War press office (Berlin)
 Information centre
 Censorship office
 Foreign office
 Domestic office

Bibliography

References

Disinformation operations
German Army (German Empire)
Defunct German intelligence agencies
Military intelligence agencies